Radhey Gupta (born 8 October 1978) is an Indian former cricketer. He played three first-class matches for Delhi in 2001/02.

See also
 List of Delhi cricketers

References

External links
 

1978 births
Living people
Indian cricketers
Delhi cricketers
Cricketers from Delhi